Rosmarie Waldrop (born Rosmarie Sebald; August 24, 1935) is an American poet, novelist, translator, essayist and publisher. Born in Germany, she has lived in the United States since 1958 and has settled in Providence, Rhode Island since the late 1960s. Waldrop is a co-editor and publisher of Burning Deck Press.

Early life in Germany
Waldrop was born in Kitzingen am Main on August 24, 1935. Her father, Joseph Sebald, taught physical education at the town's high school. Towards the end of the Second World War, she joined a travelling theatre, but returned to school in early 1946. At school, she studied piano and flute and played in a youth orchestra. During Christmas in 1954, the orchestra gave a concert for American soldiers stationed at Kitzingen. After the performance, Keith Waldrop, a member of the audience, invited members of the orchestra to listen to his records. He and Rosmarie became friendly and worked together over the next few months, translating German poetry into English.

University years
That same year, she entered the University of Würzburg, where she studied literature, art history and musicology. In 1955, she transferred to the University of Freiburg, where she discovered the writings of Robert Musil and participated in a protest against a lecture given by Heidegger. She then moved to the University of Aix-Marseille, where Keith spent 1956–57 on his GI Bill. At the end of the year, he returned to the University of Michigan. In 1958, he won a Major Hopwood Prize, sending most of the money to Rosmarie to pay for her passage to the United States.

In the United States
The couple married and Rosmarie enrolled at the University of Michigan, where she received a Ph.D. in 1966. She also became active in literary, musical and artistic circles around the university and the wider Ann Arbor community. She began serious translation of French and German poetry. In 1961, the Waldrops bought a second-hand printing press and started Burning Deck Magazine. This was the beginning of Burning Deck, which was to become one of the most influential small press publishers of innovative poetry in the United States. As such, she is sometimes closely associated with the Language poets.

Poetry and translations
Rosmarie Waldrop started publishing her own poetry in English in the late 1960s. Since then, she has published over three dozen books of poetry, prose and translation. Today her work is variously characterized as verse experiment, philosophical statement and personal narrative. Of the many formative influences on her mature style, a crucial influence was a year spent in Paris in the early 1970s, where she came into contact with leading avant garde French poets, including Claude Royet-Journoud, Anne-Marie Albiach, and Edmond Jabès. These writers influenced her own work, while at the same time she and Keith became some of the main translators of their work into English, with Burning Deck one of the main vehicles for introducing their work to an English-language readership.

Awards and honors
Rosmarie Waldrop has given readings and published in many parts of Europe as well as the United States. She has received numerous awards and fellowships and was made a Chevalier des Arts et des Lettres by the French government. In 2003 she was awarded a grant from the Foundation for Contemporary Arts' Grants to Artists Award. She was elected to the American Academy of Arts and Sciences in 2006. She received the 2008 PEN Award for Poetry in Translation for her translation of Ulf Stolterfoht's book Lingos I - IX. Her translation of Almost 1 Book / Almost 1 Life by Elfriede Czurda was nominated for the Best Translated Book Award in 2013. She was given the America Award in Literature for a lifetime contribution to international writing in 2021.

Selected publications

Poetry
 The Aggressive Ways of the Casual Stranger, NY: Random House, 1972
 The Road Is Everywhere or Stop This Body, Columbia, MO: Open Places, 1978
 When They Have Senses, Providence: Burning Deck, 1980
 Nothing Has Changed, Windsor, VT: Awede Press, 1981
 Differences for Four Hands, Philadelphia: Singing Horse, 1984; repr. Providence: Paradigm Press, 1999
 Streets Enough to Welcome Snow, Barrytown, NY: Station Hill, 1986
 The Reproduction of Profiles, NY: New Directions, 1987
 Shorter American Memory, Providence: Paradigm Press, 1988
 Peculiar Motions, Berkeley, CA: Kelsey Street Press, 1990
 Lawn of Excluded Middle, NY: Tender Buttons, 1993
 A Key Into the Language of America, NY: New Directions, 1994
 Another Language: Selected Poems, Jersey City: Talisman House, 1997
 Split Infinites, Philadelphia: Singing Horse Press, 1998
 Reluctant Gravities, NY: New Directions, 1999
 (with Keith Waldrop) Well Well Reality, Sausalito, CA: The Post-Apollo Press, 1998
 Love, Like Pronouns, Omnidawn Publishing, 2003
 Blindsight, New York: New Directions, 2004
 Splitting Image, Zasterle, 2006
 Curves to the Apple, New Directions, 2006
 Driven to Abstraction, New Directions, 2010
Gap Gardening: Selected Poems, New Directions, 2016
The Nick of Time, New Directions, 2021

Fiction
 The Hanky of Pippin's Daughter, Barrytown, NY: Station Hill, 1986
 A Form/of Taking/It All, Barrytown, NY: Station Hill, 1990

Essays and criticism
 Against Language?, The Hague: Mouton/Berlin: Walter de Gruyter, 1971
The Ground Is the Only Figure: Notebook Spring 1996, Providence: The Impercipient Lecture
Series,Vol.1, No.3 (April 1997) 
Lavish Absence: Recalling and Rereading Edmond Jabès, Wesleyan University Press, 2002
Dissonance (if you are interested), University Alabama Press, 2005

Translations
The Book of Questions by Edmond Jabès, 7 vols. bound as 4, Wesleyan UP, 1976, 1977, 1983, 1984
From a Reader's Notebook, by Alain Veinstein, Annex Press, Ithaca New York, 1983
Paul Celan: Collected Prose, by Paul Celan, Manchester & NY: Carcanet & Sheep Meadow, 1986
The Book of Dialogue by Edmond Jabès, Wesleyan UP, 1987
Late Additions: Poems by Emmanuel Hocquard (with Connell McGrath), Peterborough, Cambs.: Spectacular Diseases, 1988
The Book of Shares by Edmond Jabès, Chicago UP, 1989
Some Thing Black by Jacques Roubaud, Elmwood Park, IL: Dalkey Archive, 1990
The Book of Resemblances by Edmond Jabès, 3 vols., Wesleyan UP, 1990, 91, 92
From the Book to the Book by Edmond Jabès, Wesleyan UP, 1991
The Book of Margins by Edmond Jabès, Chicago UP, 1993
A Foreigner Carrying in the Crook of His Arm a Tiny Book by Edmond Jabès, Wesleyan UP, 1993
Heiligenanstalt by Friederike Mayröcker, Providence: Burning Deck, 1994
The Plurality of Worlds of Lewis by Jacques Roubaud, Normal, IL: Dalkey Archive Press, 1995
Mountains in Berlin: Selected Poems by Elke Erb, Providence: Burning Deck, 1995
The Little Book of Unsuspected Subversion by Edmond Jabès, Stanford UP, 1996
With Each Clouded Peak by Friederike Mayröcker (with Harriett Watts), Los Angeles, CA: Sun & Moon Press, 1998
A Test of Solitude by Emmanuel Hocquard, Providence: Burning Deck, 2000
(with Harry Mathews and Christopher Middleton) Many Glove Compartments by Oskar Pastior, Providence: Burning Deck, 2001
Desire for a Beginning Dread of One Single End by Edmond Jabès (Images & Design by Ed Epping), New York, New York : Granary Books, 2001
The Form of a City Changes Faster, Alas, Than the Human Heart by Jacques Roubaud, Dalkey Archive Press; Translation edition, 2006 
Almost 1 Book / Almost 1 Life by Elfriede Czurda, Providence, Burning Deck, 2012
Under the Dome: Walks with Paul Celan by Jean Daive, San Francisco: City Lights Books, 2020

Notes

Further reading
Rosmarie & Keith Waldrop: Ceci n'est pas Keith, Ceci n'est pas Rosmarie: Autobiographies, Burning Deck (Providence, Rhode Island, 2002)

External links
Exhibits, sites, and homepages
Rosmarie Waldrop at the Electronic Poetry Center (EPC)
Rosmarie Waldrop Exhibit at the Academy of American Poets
Burning Deck

Readings and talks (audiofiles)
Rosmarie Waldrop at Penn Sound

Others on Waldrop including reviews, criticism, and retrospectives
Apples of Discourse by poet by Ben Lerner in Jacket upon the publication of Waldrop's Curves to the Apple, which gathers her trilogy of prose poems into one volume
Rosmarie Waldrop: Dictionary of Literary Biography v.169 (1996) includes "Bibliographical Information", "Biographical and Critical Essay", and "Further Readings about the Author". The piece's author notes: "Written in 1994–1995, the entry does not take into account Rosmarie Waldrop's substantial accomplishments since that time".

Interviews
12 or 20 questions: with Rosmarie Waldrop this interview first appeared on-line January 11, 2008 and includes many indispensable links
 A Conversation between Joan Retallack and Rosmarie Waldrop see Joan Retallack for further information
Experimental Poetry Press Closes Shop: An Interview with Burning Deck’s Rosmarie Waldrop Words Without Borders, 15 Dec. 2015.

Work online including poems and essays
Between Tongues: An Interview / & ''5 Poems on this page, scroll down to 17 Dec 2005 for links to her work

1935 births
Living people
People from Kitzingen
English-language poets
American book publishers (people)
Writers from Rhode Island
German women writers
American women poets
American editors
American translators
French–English translators
University of Michigan alumni
21st-century American women